Patrick Fabio Maxime Kisnorbo (born 24 March 1981) is an Australian professional football manager and former player who is currently the manager of  club Troyes. He is also known by his nicknames Paddy and PK. As a player, Kisnorbo was a primarily a centre-back, but also played as a defensive midfielder. He made eighteen appearances for the Australia national team.

Kisnorbo was a fans' favourite at Leicester City, accumulating over 100 appearances in his four years at the club. During his time with Leicester, he was at the centre of a number of refereeing controversies in which officiating calls were later shown to be wrong. He has also suffered some injuries that affected his playing ability for a time. Kisnorbo has represented Australia at international level in three tournaments; the 2002 and 2004 Nation Cups and the 2007 Asian Cup. He started his professional career at South Melbourne and later played for the Scottish club Hearts before joining Leicester and then transferring to Leeds United.

Kisnorbo won the 2009–10 fans Player of The Season award and also the Players Player Award for Leeds United in his debut season. During his first two years at Leeds, Kisnorbo wore a headband bandage when playing football as 'a superstition' after initially wearing it following a head injury suffered on his Leeds debut.

Early life
Kisnorbo was born in Melbourne to a Mauritian father and an Italian mother who was from Trieste. Because of his mother's birth, Kisnorbo holds an Italian passport, which allows him to bypass European Union work permit restrictions. He is fluent in Italian.

Club career

Early career
Kisnorbo began playing football as a youth in his hometown with Essendon City and Bulleen. As a 15-Year old, he moved to South Melbourne's youth team, where he stayed for two seasons in the National Soccer League Youth.

South Melbourne 
After a string of stand-out performances for the youth team, Kisnorbo was selected for the senior team, which was competing in the now defunct National Soccer League. Kisnorbo performed like a seasoned veteran and cemented his spot at centre back as a youngster ahead of more experienced players at the club. In his first season, Kisnorbo's performances led to South Melbourne winning the 2000-01 Premiership, 8 points ahead of second place.

In his secondary season, Kisnorbo performances led him to be awarded the Theo Marmaras medal for the best player at South Melbiurne during the 2002 season.

Kisnorbo went on to make 67 appearances for the club and scored on 3 occasions. His big stature and toughness made him a fan-favourite to the Hellas fans and attracted international interest following his performances for the club.

Hearts
After much speculation, Kisnorbo made his move from South Melbourne to the Edinburgh-based Scottish Premier League club Hearts in July 2003, signing a two-year contract. He was recommended to Hearts by former player Dave McPherson. Kisnorbo quickly became a regular for the first team where he made 48 appearances in two seasons, scoring his only league goal in a 2–1 win over Hibernian on 24 October 2004.

Kisnorbo also played in the UEFA Cup against such clubs as Bordeaux, Feyenoord, Schalke 04 and Ferencváros, and scored a goal against Portuguese club SC (Sporting Club) Braga. He spent 18 months at Hearts, playing a total of 64 competitive games, before his contract expired at the end of the 2004–05 season. It was not renewed by the club.

Leicester City
Kisnorbo joined Leicester City in April 2005 after leaving Hearts, signing a pre-contract agreement in January. He followed former Hearts boss Craig Levein, teammates Mark de Vries and Alan Maybury across the border to the Midlands club.

Kisnorbo's first goal for Leicester came on 15 October 2005 against Watford at Vicarage Road, which turned out to be the match winner. His initial appearances for Leicester were as a midfielder, and at first he failed to adjust and was booed by his own fans during a 2–1 defeat to Sheffield Wednesday. However, a move back to defence resulted in a change in fortunes for Kisnorbo, and his partnership with then-teammate Paddy McCarthy was instrumental in helping Leicester avoid relegation to League One that season.

Transfer speculation linked Kisnorbo to Wigan Athletic at the end of the 2005–06 season, but he decided to extend his stay with Leicester by signing a new three-year contract, less than 12 months after joining the club. Kisnorbo began the 2006–07 season well, scoring two goals and putting in fine rear-guard displays against Coventry City and Southend United, helping the club survive relegation yet again. He was linked with a move to Fulham during the January transfer window. His performance in the 2006–07 season earned him the players' player of the season award from his teammates. It was also at this point that he became a fan favourite.

2007–08 season
In the 2007–08 season, Kisnorbo was relegated to League One with the club, but was also on the receiving end of no less than three controversial refereeing decisions. His first was a goal against Scunthorpe United on 20 October, which referee Scott Mathieson ruled out for an offside, depriving Leicester of an away win. Video replay showed that Kisnorbo's disallowed goal was actually onside, greatly frustrating him, while Leicester coach Gerry Taggart commented "We have all seen the replay of Patrick's goal in the dressing room and he is clearly not offside." Kisnorbo's second was a red card by referee Phil Joslin for what the linesman claimed was a foul on Pablo Couñago. Joslin awarded Ipswich Town a penalty kick, and Ipswich won 3–1. Joslin admitted his mistake, and had the ban rescinded the following day after video replays showed Kisnorbo actually won the ball outside the penalty area. Leicester's then-manager Ian Holloway described the sending off as a "complete kerfuffle". The Leicester club was fined £3,000 by The Football Association, however, because of Kisnorbo's teammates' angry appeals to Joslin during the game. Kisnorbo's third was another red card by referee Mike Pike for a foul on Billy Sharp on 5 April 2008. Pike awarded Sheffield United a penalty kick as they won 3–0. Video replays, however, showed no contact between the two, confirming that Sharp was diving. Holloway branded Pike's decision "embarrassing", saying "that was the biggest blunder I've seen in a long time." Leicester also succeeded in their appeal against the second red card.

Further misfortune came when Kisnorbo suffered damaged knee ligaments in 3–1 defeat to Sheffield Wednesday on 26 April 2008, sidelining him for six months. His injury badly affected Leicester's hopes of surviving in the Championship. He played his 100th game and scored his last ever goal for Leicester in a 2–0 home win over Ipswich on 26 December 2007.

2008–09 season
Kisnorbo returned to action the following season in a 3–0 reserve team win over Rushden & Diamonds on 2 October. He later returned for the first team coming on as a substitute in a 1–1 draw against Oldham Athletic on 18 October 2008. However, he was struck with another ligament injury to his other knee in a 3–0 FA Cup win over Stevenage Borough on 9 November, putting him out for two more months. Kisnorbo made his competitive return as a second-half substitute in a 1–0 win over Millwall on 14 March 2009, but by then was facing competition in the first team from teammates Wayne Brown, Jack Hobbs, Michael Morrison and Aleksandar Tunchev. He started just three games in the second half of the season, which saw the club secure their promotion as League One champions.

It was reported on 28 April that manager Nigel Pearson told Kisnorbo he could leave on a free transfer the following summer as the club began their preparations for their Championship campaign the following season. Leicester on 29 May released Kisnorbo at the end of his contract, along with Paul Henderson, Marc Edworthy, Bruno Ngotty and Barry Hayles. Kisnorbo stated he was "very disappointed to have been released", and made it clear that he wanted "to show Leicester next season what they are missing because I'm desperate to stay in the Championship." He had trials with Crystal Palace and Derby County, but was unable to secure a move to either club.

Leeds United

2009–10 season
On 22 July 2009, Kisnorbo signed for Leeds United on a two-year contract. He made his debut in a 2–1 win over Exeter City on 8 August. On his debut Kisnorbo suffered a head wound which required stitches, after receiving stitches to the wound off the pitch he came out wearing a head bandage. After playing for Australia on 12 August, Kisnorbo became Leeds's 100th full international player. Whilst at Leeds he established himself as a fans' favourite for his solid performances and his brave style of play. After suffering the head injury, which required 12 stitches, Kisnorbo wore a protective headband. He rejected plastic surgery to avoid losing his place in the team: "I can't see myself going for [surgery] at the moment because I've got bigger things to worry about than getting this sorted."

Kisnorbo scored his first goal for Leeds against Millwall on his return to the starting lineup after missing the previous game against Norwich City having picked up an illness on international duty. His international call-ups along with other internationals at Leeds resulted in games against Swindon Town and Bristol Rovers being postponed. Kisnorbo missed the games against Kettering Town, Oldham Athletic and local rivals Huddersfield Town through an injury he picked up in training. He had not recovered from injury to be able to have a part in the squad in the FA Cup replay to Kettering. Instead, the Australia international returned to the Leeds starting line up against Brentford.

Kisnorbo played against Manchester United when Leeds won 1–0 away at Old Trafford on 3 January in the FA Cup, during which he and Richard Naylor "bolted the door against the assaults of Wayne Rooney and Dimitar Berbatov", after which he was described as a hero. Kisnorbo missed the Football League Trophy Northern Section Final first leg loss against Carlisle United with a calf injury. Kisnorbo returned to Leeds' starting lineup, and played the full 90 minutes, in the next game where Leeds earned a 2–2 draw against Tottenham Hotspur in the FA Cup.

Kisnorbo was part of the Leeds defence, who were defeated 3–0 by Swindon Town. Kisnorbo was omitted from the Leeds squad in the next game against Colchester United after being ruled out by injury. The injury also forced him to miss the FA Cup replay at Elland Road against Tottenham Hotspur, the League One game against Hartlepool United and the Football League Trophy Northern Section final second leg against Carlisle.

Kisnorbo's season prematurely ended after he suffered a suspected ruptured achilles tendon against Millwall in March, ending his hopes of playing in Leeds's promotion charge, and also his dream of playing in the 2010 FIFA World Cup. Leeds as a result signed Neill Collins on loan from Preston to cover his absence.

In May 2010, he was selected in the Football League One PFA Team of the Year for the 2009–10 season. On the final day of the season Kisnorbo was named as the fans' Leeds United Player of the Season and also the Players' Player of the Season. Leeds were promoted to the Football League Championship after finishing in 2nd place in League 1 and thus earning automatic promotion.

2010–11 season
Kisnorbo joined the Leeds squad on the pre-season tour of Slovakia despite being injured. Grayson confirmed that Kisnorbo was looking to return from his Achilles tendon rupture injury around December/January time meaning he would miss at least half of the 2010/11 season for Leeds. Manager Simon Grayson revealed contract talks with Kisnorbo would start once the defender returned from injury and managed to prove his fitness. After having another operation on his injury in October 2010, Grayson said that Kisnorbo was looking to return later than planned, with an estimated return around February/March 2011.

On 20 November, Grayson reiterated his desire to keep Kisnorbo but stated that he had to prove his fitness before being offered a new deal at Leeds. Kisnorbo got an infection on his Achilles tendon injury, and stepped up his rehab by going to the US for treatment. Kisnorbo returned to Leeds' training ground Thorp Arch during mid January. However, on 11 March 2011, it was confirmed that he would not play again in the 2010–11 season. As Kisnorbo's contract was set to expire in June 2011, he had to prove his fitness to the coaching staff at Leeds in the hope of earning a new contract, or be free to join another club. In March 2011, Kisnorbo returned to full training with Leeds after his long spell out injured.

In Leeds' penultimate game of the season, against Burnley, Kisnorbo made the provisional squad but failed to make the substitutes bench. On 6 May, Grayson revealed the club were going to offer Kisnorbo a new contract on a short term deal, which, if he accepted, would allow him more time to earn a new long term deal once he proved his fitness. On 7 May, Kisnorbo was named on the bench for Leeds against Queens Park Rangers, the first time he was included in a matchday squad since suffering his ruptured Achilles tendon. Kisnorbo made his first appearance of the season as a second-half substitute against QPR in the final game of the season.

2011–12 season
With Kisnorbo only on a short term contract to prove his fitness, Crystal Palace and Brighton & Hove Albion were linked with signing the player. Manager Simon Grayson then claimed that he was looking for Kisnorbo to prove his fitness before offering him a longer term contract. After completing his injury rehab in his native Australia, Kisnorbo returned to pre-season training for Leeds United a week later than his teammates. After returning from his long injury lay off, and proving his fitness, Kisnorbo signed a new two-year contract at Leeds on 10 July. Kisnorbo revealed he wouldn't be wearing his iconic head bandage for the 2011–12 season as he wanted it to represent a new start for him. Kisnorbo scored the opening goal in the pre-season friendly victory against Newcastle United. Kisnorbo started for Leeds on the opening day of the season as they suffered a 3–1 defeat against Southampton. It was his first competitive start for Leeds since picking up his injury against Millwall 17 months earlier.

Kisnorbo was handed the captaincy in the absence of suspended captain Jonny Howson on 16 August against Hull City. Kisnorbo scored an own goal against West Ham United on 21 August. Kisnorbo's poor form continued when he was sent off and gave away a penalty for Leeds in the match against Bristol City on 17 September. As a result of the suspension, Kisnorbo missed the League Cup game against fierce rivals Manchester United. After a spell on the bench due to the partnership of Tom Lees and Darren O'Dea, Kisnorbo came on as a substitute replacing O'Dea in Leeds' 1–1 draw against Cardiff City on 30 October. After starting in the 5–0 loss against Blackpool, Kisnorbo put in an impressive performance against his old side Leicester City on 6 November to help earn Leeds a clean sheet in a 1–0 win.

Due to the knee injury sustained by Captain Jonny Howson, Kisnorbo took over the captain's armband, starting with Leeds' 1–1 draw against Watford on 10 December, in which Kisnorbo gave away a penalty which was saved by Leeds keeper Alex McCarthy with Leeds 1–0 down. The save proved crucial as Leeds scored a last minute equaliser.

Kisnorbo's season was ended on 2 January when he sustained a serious knee injury in Leeds' 2–1 win over Burnley. In April, Kisnorbo revealed he had stepped up in his comeback and had started running again in training, but there was no timescale put on his return.

2012–13 season
Manager Neil Warnock revealed on 3 May that he was hoping that Kisnorbo may return from injury in time for the start of the 2012–13 pre-season. With Kisnorbo missing several pre-season games he wasn't allocated a number for the 2012–13 season, losing his number 3 squad number to Adam Drury. Kisnorbo returned to the Leeds squad on 4 August in the pre-season friendly against Preston North End. Kisnorbo was allocated the squad number 6 for the upcoming season and was named on the bench for the first game of the season against Shrewsbury Town on 11 August.

Kisnorbo made his first start of the season on 28 August 2012 in a League Cup match against Oxford United.

In January 2013, he signed for Ipswich Town on a one-month loan.

On 3 May 2013, it was announced that Kisnorbo, along with 10 other players were being released from the club.

Melbourne City
On 9 September 2013, it was announced that Kisnorbo had signed a one-year contract with Melbourne City as a replacement for the injured Orlando Engelaar. He was appointed captain of Melbourne City for the 2014–15 season.

Retirement
On 1 May 2016, Kisnorbo announced his retirement from professional football.

International career
Kisnorbo was part of Australia's 2001 Youth World Cup campaign, playing five matches for the under-20 team in Oceania qualifiers, including a goal against Papua New Guinea. He remained on the squad for the finals, appearing in all the matches leading up to Australia's second-round elimination at the hands of Brazil. His performances in the under-20 level and his senior career at South Melbourne FC led to his first international appearance on 6 July 2002 against Vanuatu in Australia's first match of the 2002 OFC Nations Cup. He made three appearances in the tournament including the defeat to New Zealand in the final.

In 2004 Kisnorbo was again selected for the squad for the Oceania Cup. In Australia's last group match against Solomon Islands he was sent off for receiving two yellow cards, ending his tournament. He declined to join the "Olyroos" squad for an Olympic preparation tour in July, electing to concentrate on cementing a place at Hearts in the pre-season. This decision harmed his national team aspirations, as he was left out of the squad that eventually lost to Iraq in the quarter-finals.

Kisnorbo made appearances for Australia in friendlies against Ghana, Denmark, China and Uruguay. These performances led to his selection for the Australian 2007 AFC Asian Cup squad, playing in the first two group matches against Oman and Iraq. After Australia tied the first match and lost the second, Kisnorbo was dropped from the starting line-up amongst a host of changes. He played no further part in the tournament as Australia were eventually knocked out by Japan.

It was widely regarded that Kisnorbo's poor performance at the Asian Cup had ruined his chances of ever returning to international level, and he remained outside the Australian national squad for over two years, however, following admirable performances with his new club Leeds United, Kisnorbo regained his international place in 2009 and started in a 3–0 friendly win over Republic of Ireland on 12 August 2009, nearly scoring a goal in the 22nd minute when his header was saved at pointblank range by goalkeeper Shay Given. On 5 September 2009, Kisnorbo scored his first goal for Australia in a game against South Korea. Kisnorbo was subsequently selected in the Australian squad for a friendly against the Netherlands on 10 October 2009.

Kisnorbo's ruptured Achilles tendon injury suffered against Millwall in March 2010 ruled him out of the 2010 World Cup for Australia.

In June 2011, Kisnorbo was recalled to the Australia national side for the first time since recovering from his Achilles tendon injury when he was called up to train with the national side in a non-playing role ahead of the friendly against Serbia.

Coaching career

Melbourne City
Upon retiring, Kisnorbo was appointed as an assistant youth coach at Melbourne City under Joe Palatsides, and was also an assistant coach for their W-League team. In July 2017, Kisnorbo was appointed head coach of the W-League team.

In July 2018, Kisnorbo was appointed assistant coach of the Melbourne City men's team, with Rado Vidošić replacing him as manager of the W-League team.

In September 2020, Kisnorbo was appointed head coach of Melbourne City, following the departure of Erick Mombaerts.

In May 2021, Kisnorbo led Melbourne City to their first ever A-League trophy in that team's eleven-year history by claiming the A-League Premiers Plate. There was much admiration for the way Kisnorbo had instilled in the Melbourne City team a level of determination and fighting spirit which many attribute as characteristics that Kisnorbo himself had during his playing days.

In June, Kisnorbo then guided City to their first A-League Championship, winning the double in his debut A-League coaching season. Again, he was credited with instilling a tenacious work-rate and hardened sense of self-belief in a very young team, made up partly of the club's academy graduates.

Troyes
On 23 November 2022, Kisnorbo was announced as manager of French top division side, and fellow City Football Group club, Troyes. He becomes the first Australian manager of a team in a 'Top 5' European men's league.

Career statistics

Club

International

Scores and results list Australia's goal tally first, score column indicates score after each Kisnorbo goal.

Managerial statistics

Men's teams

Honours

Player
South Melbourne
National Soccer League Premiership: 2000–01

Leicester City
Football League One: 2008–09

Leeds United
Football League One runner-up: 2009–10

Australia U20
OFC U-20 Championship: 2001

Australia
OFC Nations Cup: 2004

Individual
League One PFA Team of the Year: 2009–10
Leeds United Player of the Year: 2009–10
South Melbourne Player of the Year 2001-2002

Manager
Melbourne City
A-League premiership: 2020–21, 2021–22
A-League championship: 2021

References

External links
Patrick Kisnorbo profile at the Leeds United website

Patrick Kisnorbo at OzFootball

1981 births
Living people
Soccer players from Melbourne
Australian people of Italian descent
Sportspeople of Italian descent
Australian people of Mauritian descent
Association football defenders
Australia international soccer players
Australian expatriate soccer players
Scottish Premier League players
English Football League players
National Soccer League (Australia) players
Heart of Midlothian F.C. players
Leicester City F.C. players
South Melbourne FC players
Leeds United F.C. players
Ipswich Town F.C. players
2002 OFC Nations Cup players
2004 OFC Nations Cup players
2007 AFC Asian Cup players
People educated at St. Bernard's College, Melbourne
Melbourne City FC players
A-League Men players
Melbourne City FC non-playing staff
Australian soccer players
Expatriate footballers in England
Expatriate footballers in Scotland
Australian expatriate sportspeople in England
Australian expatriate sportspeople in Scotland